Carla Capalbo is an English-American food writer, journalist, and author.

Career 
Capalbo writes regularly for magazines and newspapers, including Decanter, National Geographic, BBC Olive, The Independent, The World of Fine Wine, Bon Appétit, Departures, and Food & Wine. She is a long-time member of Slow Food, the Guild of Food Writers, and the Circle of Wine Writers and has won Italy's Luigi Veronelli prize for best foreign food writer. In 2017 she featured in the BBC Radio 4 Food Programme's documentary on the food and wine of Georgia.

Saveur called her book Tasting Georgia "without question the best book ever written in English about Georgian food and wine."

Selected works 
 The Ultimate Italian Cookbook (1998)
 The Food and Wine Lover's Companion to Tuscany (2002)
 Tasting Georgia (2016)

References 

Living people
Year of birth missing (living people)